Matthew Bryden is a Canadian political analyst active in the Horn of Africa. He worked for several aid and political organizations in Somalia after spending some time in the region during his leave from the Canadian military in 1987. He served as the Coordinator for the Monitoring Group Eritrea (EMG) from 2008-2012. He is now a Director at Sahan Research, a think tank based in Nairobi.

Early life
Matthew Bryden was born in the UK and grew up in Canada. He attended Upper Canada College in Toronto, where he graduated in 1985. Bryden joined the Canadian Forces Reserve and became interested in African aid programs after visiting the region during a military leave in 1987.

Career
Bryden was hired by the Cooperative for Assistance and Relief Everywhere (CARE) program in January 1988 and the following year joined the United Nations Development Program (UNDP) in Berbera, Somalia. He was reassigned to Nairobi, Kenya in August 1990, when the UN evacuated non-essential staff.

In 1992, Bryden was appointed Special Advisor to the Canadian Ambassador on Somali Affairs. He led the War-torn Societies Project (WSP) from 1996 to 2003 and in the two years following acted as the Horn of Africa Director for the International Crisis Group (ICG). From 2007 to 2008, he served as an adviser on Somali affairs for the United States Agency for International Development USAID and the US embassy.

In 2008, Bryden was appointed Coordinator of the Monitoring Group on Somalia and Eritrea (SEMG), which monitored violations of the general and complete arms embargo introduced by United Nations Security Council Resolution 733 on 23 January 1992. According to journalist Robert Young Pelton, under Bryden's tenure the SEMG's reports grew, "accusing both friend and foe of violations." This included reports that the United States violated the embargo when making anti-terrorist missile strikes, and an incident where two journalists were detained under suspicions of being mercenaries. Bryden said he considered any munitions delivered to Somalia to be a breach of the embargo.

Bryden accused then Puntland President Abdirahman Farole and other government officials of being on the payroll of pirate gangs. Abdirahman Farole in turn accused Bryden of using his position at the SEMG to create inflated reports of munitions in the neighboring regions of Somaliland in order to support his interest in the secession of Somaliland. He noted Bryden was married to a well-connected woman from the region's dominant, Isaaq clan. Bryden stepped down from his SEMG position in mid-2012.

Bryden is considered a leading authority on the insurgency in Somali. As of 2013, Bryden was serving as a Director at Sahan Research, a Nairobi-based think tank. In 2018, the Somali government banned Sahan Research and accused its founder, Matt Bryden of espionage and meddling in the country's politics. An article published in The Elephant, authored by Bryden explains that he was covicted in his absentia of espionage on 26 October 2021 by a Somali court and sentenced to five years in prison. The court also ruled that Sahan Research would be banned in from Somalia. He is declared persona non grata in Somalia but continues to run Sahan from Nairobi, Kenya.

Personal life
As of 2010, Bryden lives in Nairobi, Kenya. Bryden speaks fluent Somali.

Bibliography
 New hope for Somalia? The building block approach, 1999
 The Banana Test: Is Somaliland Ready for Recognition, 2003
 Somalia and Somaliland: Envisioning a dialogue on the question of Somali unity, 2004
 Rebuilding Somaliland: Issues and Possibilities, 2005
 Report of the United Nations Monitoring Group on Somalia and Eritrea Submitted in Accordance with Resolution 1916, 2010 (coauthor)

References 

1960s births
Living people
Upper Canada College alumni
Canadian officials of the United Nations
Canadian expatriates in Somalia
Canadian expatriates in Kenya
Alumni of King's College London